John Busolo (born 13 March 1965) is a Kenyan footballer. He played in five matches for the Kenya national football team from 1990 to 1996. He was also named in Kenya's squad for the 1990 African Cup of Nations tournament.

References

External links
 

1965 births
Living people
Kenyan footballers
Kenya international footballers
1990 African Cup of Nations players
Place of birth missing (living people)
Association football goalkeepers
A.F.C. Leopards players
Bandari F.C. (Kenya) players
Free State Stars F.C. players
Kenyan expatriate footballers
Expatriate soccer managers in South Africa